Elmer H. W. Schaake (February 7, 1911 – January 24, 1966) was an American football, basketball, and baseball player and coach.  He played college football and college basketball at the University of Kansas and one season of professional football in the National Football League with the Portsmouth Spartans.  Schaake served as the head football coach at Bethany College in Lindsborg, Kansas from 1934 to 1937, compiling a record of 13–19–2.  He was also the head baseball coach at his alma mater, Kansas, for one season in 1944 and the head basketball coach at Willamette University during the 1946–47 season.

Playing career

Kansas
Schaake played football at the University of Kansas from 1930 to 1932 and was named unanimous All Big–Six Conference. He also played for the basketball team at Kansas.

Portsmouth Spartans
Schaake played one season of professional football in 1933 with the Portsmouth Spartans  After one year of professional football, he chose to enter the coaching ranks.

Coaching career
Schaake coached for 30 years.  Schaake was the head football coach at Bethany College in Lindsborg, Kansas for four seasons, from 1934 to 1937, compiling a record of 13–19–2.

After Bethany, Schaake  spent five years at Lawrence High School where he compiled a 29–11–4 record and served one year as an assistant for the University of Kansas before moving to California to coach at the college, junior college and high school levels.  He also worked as the head baseball coach of the Jayhawks for one year.

Awards
In 1972, Schaake was inducted in the Kansas Sports Hall of Fame.

Head coaching record

College football

References

External links
 
 

1911 births
1966 deaths
American football halfbacks
Basketball coaches from Kansas
Guards (basketball)
Bethany Swedes football coaches
Kansas Jayhawks baseball coaches
Kansas Jayhawks football coaches
Kansas Jayhawks football players
Willamette Bearcats men's basketball coaches
High school basketball coaches in Kansas
High school football coaches in Kansas
Portsmouth Spartans players
Sportspeople from Lawrence, Kansas
Players of American football from Kansas